Sir Frederick William Heygate, 2nd Baronet (1822–1894), of the Heygate Baronets, was an Irish Conservative Party politician.  He served as a Member of Parliament (MP) for Londonderry from 1865 to 1874.

References

1822 births
1894 deaths
Baronets in the Baronetage of the United Kingdom
Members of the Parliament of the United Kingdom for County Londonderry constituencies (1801–1922)
UK MPs 1859–1865
UK MPs 1865–1868
UK MPs 1868–1874
Irish Conservative Party MPs